Direct Hit may refer to:
Direct Hit Technologies, a Boston-based search engine company acquired by Ask Jeeves in January 2000
Direct Hit Records, a record label and store based in Dallas, Texas
Direct Hit (film), a 1994 film starring William Forsythe
Direct Hit (band), a Milwaukee-based punk rock band 
Direct Hit, a single from the album It's a Bit Complicated by British band Art Brut

See also 
DirectHit, a pharmacodiagnostic test used to determine the tumor sensitivity or resistance to drug regimens
"Direct Hit! Operation Dead Ball", an episode of the 1977-1980 Japanese animated television series Lupin III Part II 
Direct Hits (disambiguation)
The Best of Collin Raye: Direct Hits, country singer Collin Raye's first greatest hits album